The Journal of Coatings Technology and Research is a bimonthly peer-reviewed scientific journal. It is owned by the American Coatings Association and published on their behalf by Springer Science+Business Media. The editor-in-chief of the journal is Dr. Mark Nichols (Ford Motor Company).

Scope 
Areas of research covered in the Journal of Coatings Technology and Research include the manufacture of functional, protective and decorative coatings including paints, inks and related coatings and their raw materials. The journal publishes research papers describing chemistry, physics, materials science, and engineering studies relevant to surface coatings; Applications papers on experimental solutions for technological problems in the design, formulation, manufacture, application, use and performance of surface coatings; review articles offering broad, critical overviews of advances in coatings science; and brief communications, presenting notes and letters on research topics of limited scope or immediate impact.

Abstracting and indexing
The journal is abstracted and indexed in:

External links 

English-language journals
Materials science journals
Springer Science+Business Media academic journals
Bimonthly journals
Publications established in 2004
Paint and coatings industry